Turkmenistan competed at the 2014 Summer Youth Olympics, in Nanjing, China from 16 August to 28 August 2014.

Swimming

Turkmenistan qualified one swimmer.

Girls

Weightlifting

Turkmenistan was given a quota to compete in a boys' event by the tripartite committee.

Boys

Wrestling

Turkmenistan was given a spot to compete from the Tripartite Commission.

Boys

References

2014 in Turkmenistani sport
Nations at the 2014 Summer Youth Olympics
Turkmenistan at the Youth Olympics